Piero Elias (born September 8, 2002) is an American soccer player who plays for New York City FC II in the MLS Next Pro.

Playing career

Youth
Piero Elias' teenage career saw him transfer between youth academies on several occasions. In 2015, he played at the development academy at Metropolitan Oval before transferring to New York City FC where he played in their under-14 program. In 2018–19 he played with Blau-Weiss Gottschee's under-16s, and then returned to Met Oval to be part of their under-18 side in 2019. In 2021 he switched to the Queensboro FC development academy, in the USL Academy League.

Senior
On March 24, 2022, Elias was announced as an inaugural season signing for MLS Next Pro club New York City FC II, signing his first full professional contract. His competitive debut came in the first game of the season in a loss on penalties to New England Revolution II on March 27. His first start came in the following game, another shootout loss to Orlando City B on April 3.

International career
In 2019 Elias was called up to the Peru under-17 team to take part in a training camp. The following year he was called up to a training camp with their under-20 team. He has yet to make an appearance for Peru at any level, however.

Career statistics
.

References 

2002 births
Living people
Soccer players from New York City
American soccer players
Peruvian footballers
American sportspeople of Peruvian descent
Association football midfielders
New York City FC II players
MLS Next Pro players